Goshen Historic District may refer to:

 Goshen Historic District (Goshen, Connecticut), listed on the National Register of Historic Places (NRHP) in Goshen, Connecticut
 West Goshen Historic District, also listed on the NRHP in Goshen, Connecticut
 Goshen Historic District (Goshen, Indiana), listed on the NRHP in Elkhart County, Indiana
 Goshenville Historic District, in East Goshen Township, Pennsylvania, listed on the NRHP in Chester County, Pennsylvania